Rosenort, may refer to:

 Rosenort, Manitoba, a community located about 17 kilometres from Morris, Manitoba
 Rosenort Airport, located adjacent to Rosenort
 Rosenort, Saskatchewan, a hamlet in Coulee Rural Municipality No. 136

See also
 Różaniec (disambiguation)